Bob Bilodeau (born August 23, 1953) is a Canadian former professional ice hockey defenceman. The Atlanta Flames selected him in the 9th round (133rd overall) of the 1973 NHL Amateur Draft; the Cincinnati Stingers also selected him in the 11th round (122nd overall) of the 1973 WHA Amateur Draft.

Bilodeau played seven seasons of professional hockey, including four seasons with the Hershey Bears of the American Hockey League.

Personal
His older brother Yvon Bilodeau was a 1971 draft pick of the Philadelphia Flyers.

References

External links

1953 births
Living people
Atlanta Flames draft picks
Canadian ice hockey defencemen
Cincinnati Stingers draft picks
Des Moines Capitols players
Estevan Bruins players
Hershey Bears players
New Westminster Bruins players
Omaha Knights (CHL) players
Tulsa Oilers (1964–1984) players
Weyburn Red Wings players
Canadian expatriate ice hockey players in the United States